Moments in Movement is the first studio album by Australian hip hop artist Macromantics. Originally released in 2006, it was re-released on Kill Rock Stars in 2007.

At the J Award of 2006, the album was nominated for Australian Album of the Year.

Track listing

References

External links
 

2006 debut albums
Macromantics albums